The 2015–16 Adelaide United FC season was the club's 12th season since its establishment in 2003. The club participated in the A-League for the 11th time, the FFA Cup for the 2nd time, as well as the AFC Champions League for the 5th time.

Despite delivering the club's first trophy since the inaugural season of the A-League in winning the FFA Cup, on 24 July Josep Gombau stood down as the manager of the club, citing family reasons for his decision. The club's technical director and mentor of Gombau while at FC Barcelona, Guillermo Amor, was instated as the club's new manager for the 2015–16 A-League season.

Players

Transfers in

Transfers out

Contract extensions

Football department staff

Kits and sponsors

Statistics

Squad statistics

|-
|colspan="24"|Players no longer at the club:

Pre-season and friendlies

Competitions

Overall

Overview

{| class="wikitable" style="text-align: center"
|-
!rowspan=2|Competition
!colspan=8|Record
|-
!
!
!
!
!
!
!
!
|-
| A-League

|-
| A-League Finals

|-
| FFA Cup

|-
| AFC Champions League

|-
! Total

A-League

League table

Results summary

Results by round

Matches

Finals series

FFA Cup

AFC Champions League

Qualifying play-off

Awards
 A-League Premiers
 A-League Champions
 Isaías – Joe Marston Medal

See also
2015–16 A-League
2015–16 in Australian soccer
2015 FFA Cup
A-League transfers for 2015–16 season

References

External links
 Official Website

Adelaide United
Adelaide United FC seasons